A pyre is a structure used to burn a body as part of a funeral rite or execution.

Pyre or pyres may also refer to:

 Pyre (character), a Marvel Comics character
 Pyre (video game), a 2017 action role-playing video game
 Children of the Pyre, a 2008 documentary film
 Eternal Pyre, a 2006 EP by Slayer
 "Funeral Pyre", a 1981 single by The Jam
 The Funeral Pyre, a Death Metal band
 Pyre (novel), the English translation of Pookuzzhi, a 2013 novel by Perumal Murugan

See also 
 Pyro (disambiguation)
 Pyra (disambiguation)